Spartocytisus supranubius (supra = above; nubius = the cloud) is a white-flowered species of broom endemic to the Canary Islands and known there by the common name retama del Teide. S. supranubius is a high mountain species, occurring at about 2000m altitude on Tenerife in Las Cañadas del Teide and on mountain tops on La Palma.

The name Spartocytisus supranubius is a synonym of the accepted name Cytisus supranubius (L.f.) Kuntze.

References

Genisteae
Endemic flora of the Canary Islands
Taxa named by Konrad H. Christ